Katum is a small village in northern Tây Ninh Province, Vietnam.

Populated places in Tây Ninh province